Soil (stylized in all lowercase) is the debut studio album by American singer and songwriter Serpentwithfeet. It was released on June 8, 2018, by Secretly Canadian and Tri Angle.

Critical reception

Soil received widespread acclaim from critics. On Metacritic, which assigns a normalized rating out of 100 to reviews from mainstream critics, the album received an average score of 87, based on 15 reviews. Dmitry Teckel of Clash described the album as "magical" and called it "presents love as a great ritual of universal joy". Sasha Geffen of Pitchfork said, "With soil, serpentwithfeet deeply engages with the complex membranes between the self and a loved one, the self and the world. Few albums attempt this much nuance in articulating love; Wise's success in his ambitions feels like a gift." Heather Phares of AllMusic gave the album four out of five stars, commented that the album "captures a passionate, complex artist coming into his own." Rachel Finn of DIY called the album as "a return to his roots and a celebration of finally having found his feet." Katherine St. Asaph of Spin gave the album a positive review, calling the album was "full of subtleties: love lost, love mourned, love repurposed." Comparing to his previous work blisters, Stephen Mayne of Under the Radar praised the album to have "richer, dense rhythms and surprising samples", commented that they "wrapped into sensuous tracks detailing love and loss." A. Harmony of Exclaim! called the album as a "courageous effort where serpentwithfeet's bravery pays off."

Accolades

Track listing
Credits adapted from Bandcamp.

Notes
All track titles are stylized in all lowercase.

References

2018 debut albums
Secretly Canadian albums